La Pastora, may refer to:

La Pastora, a town in the Caaguazú department of Paraguay
La Pastora, one of the quarters of the city of Caracas
La Pastora, quarter of the city of Cabimas, Zulia State, Venezuela
La Pastora, nickname of Florencio Pla Meseguer, also known as Teresa (1917–2004), a Spanish Maquis who used to disguise as a female
La Pastora, a Cablebús station in Mexico City